Space Heroes Universe!, formerly known as Little Space Heroes, was an online game for children developed by Bubble Gum Interactive in Australia. The game was playable for free under a freemium model. It was set in a Sci-Fi / Space setting in which players make their own hero and explore the galaxy.

In addition to the virtual world, a mobile game entitled Jetpack Jinx was launched. The virtual world ceased operations on 29 January 2015

Story
In the game, players create a Space Hero and joins the Space Heroes Academy. They complete basic training and learn how to use their Bubble Blasters, Jetpack and Starjet. The villain of the game is Lord Shadowbot, a dastardly robot with a fear of the dark. On arriving in the Heroes galaxy twenty years earlier, he stole away the Glows, a mysterious race of creatures known to give off huge amounts of light and energy. Players must search the galaxy for clues left behind and seek out the missing Glows.

The game is non-linear but does feature quests and missions. Players can earn badges and receive awards for completing various tasks and quests. A major aspect of the game is social play whereby players can interact in social environments or team-based play.

Gameplay
The game was playable within a browser using the mouse and keyboard. Most moves and control is point-and-click although there are some special keyboard commands.

Membership
The basic game was free to play with nearly 2 million players as of early 2013. Players were able to subscribe to extra features on the site by becoming a member, and paying a membership fee. Space Heroes Universe premium members were able to explore the full game, make more friends, personalize their avatar and its homepad, collect virtual pet Kritterz, unlock special achievements and get VIP access.

Accolades
Space Heroes Universe! has won a number of awards and recognitions from gaming and parenting websites. It was positively reviewed by games website MMGN, and was featured in an episode of the TV show ABC Good Game: Spawn Point.

In November 2011, it received the Seal of Approval from FamilyFriendlyVideoGames.com

Merchandise
In late 2013, Space Heroes Universe merchandise was announced, starting with a trading card game with plush toys, stationary and showbags noted or 2014

References

External links
 

2011 video games
Browser games
Multiplayer online games
Children's websites
Video games developed in Australia